Baillairgé may refer to:

 Charles Baillairgé
 François Baillairgé
 George-Frédéric-Théophile Baillairgé
 Jean Baillairgé
 Louis de Gonzague Baillairgé
 Pierre-Florent Baillairgé
 Thomas Baillairgé

French-language surnames